Diego Martín Rodríguez Berrini (born 4 September 1989 in Montevideo) is a Uruguayan footballer who plays as a defensive midfielder for Nacional.

Club career
Rodríguez started his career playing with Defensor Sporting in 2009. He made his debut on 27 October 2009 against Tacuarembó F.C.

International career

Under-20
During 2009 Rodríguez played with the Uruguayan national under-20 football team at the 2009 FIFA U-20 World Cup in Egypt. Previously, he played at the 2009 South American U-20 Championship in Venezuela where his outstanding performances led the team to qualify to the Youth World Cup.

Under-22
In 2011, he was named in the Uruguay national football team under-22 squad for the 2011 Pan American Games. He was the team captain and played a vital role for the team, helping them to reach 3rd place in the tournament.

Olympic Team
He was called up by Óscar Tabárez to the Uruguayan Olympic football team that finished ninth at the 2012 Summer Olympics, held in London, Great Britain.

Senior
On 7 November 2011 he was named in the squad for a FIFA World Cup qualification match against Chile in Montevideo.

On 15 November 2011 he was named in the squad for a friendly match against Italy in Rome.

References

External links

1989 births
Living people
Footballers from Montevideo
Uruguayan footballers
Uruguayan expatriate footballers
Association football midfielders
Defensor Sporting players
Club Atlético Independiente footballers
Udinese Calcio players
Godoy Cruz Antonio Tomba footballers
Club Tijuana footballers
Defensa y Justicia footballers
San Lorenzo de Almagro footballers
Club Nacional de Football players
Uruguayan Primera División players
Serie A players
Argentine Primera División players
Liga MX players
Footballers at the 2011 Pan American Games
Footballers at the 2012 Summer Olympics
Olympic footballers of Uruguay
Uruguay under-20 international footballers
Pan American Games medalists in football
Pan American Games bronze medalists for Uruguay
Uruguayan expatriate sportspeople in Mexico
Uruguayan expatriate sportspeople in Italy
Uruguayan expatriate sportspeople in Argentina
Expatriate footballers in Mexico
Expatriate footballers in Italy
Expatriate footballers in Argentina
Medalists at the 2011 Pan American Games